All municipalities in Ontario held elections on November 8, 1982, to elect mayors or reeves, city councillors, and school trustees. Some areas also held referendums.

Art Eggleton was re-elected as mayor of Toronto, and Mel Lastman was re-elected as mayor of the Toronto-area city North York. Outside of Toronto, Dave Neumann was returned as mayor of Brantford.

Results

Brantford

Ontario
Municipal elections in Ontario
Municipal elections
Ontario municipal elections